The women's slalom at the 1956 Winter Olympics was held on 30 January. It was run on the Col Druscie. There were forty-one gates on the first run and forty-five gates for the second run. Forty-eight women from sixteen countries entered in the race. Twelve women were disqualified during the two runs. Swiss skier Renée Colliard won gold over Austrian Regina Schöpf, who placed second, and Russian Yevgeniya Sidorova who won the bronze.

Medalists

Source:

Results

* 5 seconds penalty added.

Source:

See also

 1956 Winter Olympics

Notes

References
 

Women's alpine skiing at the 1956 Winter Olympics
Alp
Oly